Henry Burnett may refer to:

Henry Cornelius Burnett (1825–1866), Kentucky politician
Henry John Burnett (1942–1963), Scottish murderer
Henry Lawrence Burnett (1838–1916), Union general
Henry Burnett (cricketer) (born 1851), Barbadian cricketer
Henry Burnett (footballer), English footballer

See also
Harry Burnett Lumsden (1821–1896), British military officer in India